Parliamentary elections were held in Tajikistan on 26 February 1995, with a second round in 20 of the 181 constituencies on 12 March. A total of 354 candidates ran for the 181 seats, although 40% were won uncontested. The Communist Party of Tajikistan remained the largest party, although independents won the majority of seats. Voter turnout was 84.0%.

Results

References

Tajikistan
Elections in Tajikistan
1995 in Tajikistan
Election and referendum articles with incomplete results